is an airport located  northwest of Chōfu, Tokyo, Japan, west of central Tokyo. It is administered by the Bureau of Port and Harbor of the Tokyo Metropolitan Government. The airport's main commercial activity is New Central Airservice commuter flights to the Izu Islands south of Tokyo.

History
Plans for Chōfu airfield were made in 1938. Construction started in 1939 and the airport opened in 1941. It had two runways, one of 1000 meters and one of 675 meters. Although it was originally envisioned as a public airport, with the onset of World War II it was exclusively used by the Imperial Japanese Army Air Service. The airfield was host to Kawasaki Ki-61 Hien fighters used for air defense against Boeing B-29 Superfortress bombing raids by the United States Army Air Forces (USAAF).

In 1944 a number of concrete hangars were built to protect the aircraft from air attacks. Two of these are preserved in what is now a small park to the east of the current airport.

Occupied after the war by American forces, the airfield was briefly used as a base for Lockheed F-5 Lightning photo-reconnaissance aircraft of the 6th and 71st Reconnaissance Groups beginning in late September 1945, mapping the extent of wartime damage over Honshū. The mapping flights ended in January 1946, ending operational military use by the Americans. The USAAF saw no need for the facility, especially given its proximity to the densely populated urban area. It was turned over to the occupation government in 1946.

Chofu Airfield was returned to the Japanese government in 1972 as part of the Kanto Plain Consolidation Plan, under which several US military facilities in the Greater Tokyo Area were returned to Japan in exchange for upgrades to Yokota Air Base in western Tokyo. The nearby Kanto Mura military housing complex was returned to Japan in 1974. Public commercial air service began in 1979 with flights to Niijima.

Current users
The airport is currently used by a number of companies including Aerotec, Jamco,  Toho Air Service, Tokyo Airlines and New Central Airservice.

The airfield is also used by the National air and space agency JAXA which headquarters is located here. The Chōfu Aerospace Center serves as JAXA's major research and development base. As a focal point of aeronautical research and development in Japan, the center plays an important role in supporting and leading the growth of the Japanese aviation industry.

Like many Japanese airports, it has an observation area. There is an observation deck located on the second floor of the terminal. In addition there is a platform and a number of mounds located in the nearby parks.

Airlines and destinations

Statistics

Access
Please get off Chōfu Hikōjō bus stop in front of the airport terminal.

Chōfu Hikōjō

Besides, passengers who go Chofu Airport also can get off Osawa Community Center Bus stop．It takes about ten minutes from this bus stop to Chofu airport by foot．
Osawa Community Center

Accidents and incidents
On March 23, 1976, Mitsuyasu Maeno, a young right-wing nationalist and actor, took off from Chōfu Airport on a self-inspired kamikaze mission into the house of Yoshio Kodama, a Japanese organized crime figure linked to the Lockheed Scandal. Maeno felt that Kodama facilitating bribes from the American aircraft company was a betrayal of right-wing values. Maeno was killed and two of Kodama's servants were injured. Kodama was uninjured.

On August 10, 1980, a private plane crashed into the playground of Chōfu Junior High School after take-off, killing everyone on board.

On July 26, 2015, a Piper PA-46 Malibu piloted by Taishi Kawamura and carrying four passengers on board, crashed into a residential area just after take-off. Three people died in the crash, including the pilot, one of the passengers, and a woman on the ground. The other three passengers survived with injuries, as did two people on the ground. Witnesses on the ground reported that the engine made an abnormal sound as it flew over them. Several videos were uploaded to YouTube showing the airplane flying lower than usual after take-off. Three investigators from the Japan Transport Safety Board were soon dispatched to the accident site. The Tokyo Metropolitan Police Department also launched an investigation, suspecting professional negligence resulting in injury and death. Initial investigative work revealed the airplane was involved in a landing incident at an airport in Hokkaido in October 2004. Several anomalies with the flight plan were also found. Media speculations suggested the engine or professional negligence as likely causes of the crash.

References

External links

Chōfu (in Japanese) Ministry of Land, Infrastructure and Transport (Japan) Tokyo Civil Aviation Bureau
Chōfu Hikōjō Mondai (in Japanese)
Malibu.jp web site describes the fliers club and on airport "Propeller Cafe" (Japanese).

Airports in Tokyo
Transport in the Greater Tokyo Area
Airfields of the United States Army Air Forces in Occupied Japan
Airports established in 1941
Chōfu, Tokyo